Karina Petrikovičová (born 22 September 1993) is a Slovakian Paralympic swimmer who competed at international swimming competitions. She is a World silver medalist and a two-time European bronze medalist, she has also competed at the 2008, 2012 and Slovakia at the 2016 Summer Paralympics.

References

1993 births
Living people
Sportspeople from Piešťany
Paralympic swimmers of Slovakia
Swimmers at the 2008 Summer Paralympics
Swimmers at the 2012 Summer Paralympics
Swimmers at the 2016 Summer Paralympics
Medalists at the World Para Swimming Championships
Medalists at the World Para Swimming European Championships
S12-classified Paralympic swimmers